Goran Pandev (born 27 July 1983) is a Macedonian former professional footballer who played as a forward.

After establishing himself at Lazio, Pandev moved to Inter Milan in early 2010. While playing for the Nerazzurri, Pandev collected a host of honours including winning the Serie A, the Coppa Italia and the UEFA Champions League in 2010 as part of a treble for the club. On 22 April 2021, he became the first Macedonian to score 100 goals in one of the top five European football leagues. He was the captain of the North Macedonia national team until deciding to retire from international football in 2021, following UEFA Euro 2020. He is the country's all-time top scorer with 38 goals.

Club career

Early career
Pandev was born in Strumica, SR Macedonia, then still part of SFR Yugoslavia, and began his football career with FK Belasica, the club with which he progressed through the youth academy. He only spent one season in the local Prva Liga, however, before being signed by Serie A giants Inter Milan in the summer of 2001 when he was just 18 years old.

Inter loaned Pandev to feeder club Spezia in July 2002, where he was a regular in Serie C1. The following year, he was again sent on loan, this time to newly promoted Serie A club Ancona. During his time at Ancona, the team had the worst season of any club in Serie A history.

Lazio
In January 2004, Serbian player Dejan Stanković was signed by Inter from Lazio and Pandev was sent to the capital in exchange on a co-ownership deal, for a nominal fee of €500, but he remained at Ancona until the end of the 2003–04 season. Pandev impressed in his first year at Lazio, as he made 29 appearances, scoring three goals, which included a memorable effort away to Juventus where he beat Fabio Cannavaro, Lilian Thuram and Gianluca Zambrotta before beating Gianluigi Buffon with an angled shot. In July 2005, 50 percent of his player registration rights were transferred to Udinese in exchange for David Pizarro's transfer to the Milanese club.

The following season, Delio Rossi was appointed manager of Lazio and Pandev began to form a deadly strike partnership with Tommaso Rocchi. In June 2006, Lazio bought the remaining 50 percent of his registration rights from Udinese for €4 million.

On 11 January 2009, Pandev scored his first hat-trick in Serie A against Reggina.

On 24 March 2009, Pandev was awarded the Medal for Service to the Country by the then-President Branko Crvenkovski in acknowledgement of his sporting achievements and his contribution to developing and popularizing sport in Macedonia as well as promoting the country abroad.

Contract dispute with Lazio
In the summer of 2009, a dispute between Pandev and Lazio chairman Claudio Lotito erupted, resulting in a legal battle between Pandev and his club. The ruling was announced on 23 December 2009.

The dispute started with Pandev indicating his desire to leave Lazio during the summer of 2009. Chairman Lotito, apparently unhappy with Pandev's decision, froze him out of the squad. As a result, Pandev spent the remaining four months training on his own, without making a single appearance for his club. During this period, various clubs had indicated their interest in buying Pandev, most notably Zenit Saint Petersburg, who made an offer of €13 million for the player. Lazio chairman Lotito rejected the offer, demanding €15 million instead. The deal eventually fell through after both parties failed to come to an agreement on price.

On 26 September, Pandev officially filed for a termination of his contract with Lazio, having been frozen out of the squad and labelled a "rebel" by the club. Pandev argued that by freezing him out of the squad, Lazio had violated the terms of their contract with him. On 23 December 2009, the Lega Nazionale Professionisti ruled in Pandev's favor, ordering Lazio to release Pandev from his contract and pay him €170,000 for emotional distress. Lotito indicated his desire to appeal the decision.

Inter Milan
On 4 January 2010, Pandev signed a four-and-a-half year contract with Inter Milan, wearing the number 27 shirt. He made his Inter debut as a starter in the 1–0 away win against Chievo on 6 January. His first two games for the Nerazzurri resulted in him contributing to both winners — setting up Mario Balotelli against Chievo and setting up Walter Samuel to score a last minute winner against Siena. He opened his scoring account in his third appearance for the club, pulling a goal back for Inter in an eventual 2–2 draw at Bari. Pandev was the main protagonist in the 2–0 victory over local rivals Milan as he first assisted Diego Milito with an overhead cross and scored a curling freekick to complete the win. He continued with his solid performances throughout the season, being an important player in Inter's winning of the first treble in the history of Italian football. Inter won their fifth consecutive Serie A title by defeating Siena in the final match, and also defeated Roma at Stadio Olimpico to win the Coppa Italia. On 22 May 2010, Inter won the UEFA Champions League in the final against Bayern Munich, with Pandev playing for 79 minutes and becoming the third Macedonian football player in history to ever win this championship.

He began the new season on 21 August by winning the 2010 Supercoppa Italiana under Rafael Benítez, scoring the equalizer versus Roma in an eventual 3–1 home win for the first silverware of the season. Six days later, he made an appearance as substitute as Inter lost the 2010 UEFA Super Cup to Atlético Madrid. Later in December 2010, Pandev was part of the team that competed at 2010 FIFA Club World Cup. He made his debut in the competition by playing full-90 minutes in the 3–0 win versus Seongnam Ilhwa Chunma in the semi-final. On 18 December, in the final against Congo's TP Mazembe, Pandev netted inside 13 minutes to make it his first goal in a major final as Inter won 3–0 to lift the trophy. On 15 March 2011, in the second leg of 2010–11 UEFA Champions League round of 16 tie against Bayern Munich, Pandev resulted decisive by scoring in the 88th minute following a Samuel Eto'o pass to make it 3–2 for Inter. Inter progressed to the quarter-finals on away goals rule, with Pandev describing his goal as the "most important" of his career. Later on 29 May 2011, in the 2011 Coppa Italia Final match against Palermo, Pandev entered in the second half and provided the assist of Diego Milito goal in the 92nd minute for a 3–1 success. This turned out to be his last appearance for the club as he was removed during the summer transfer window.

Napoli
On 26 August 2011, Pandev joined Napoli on a season-long loan. On 10 September, Pandev came on as a substitute to make his Napoli debut against Cesena in the 66th minute with the score tied at 1–1. Despite Napoli making it 2–1 in their favour right after the Macedonian striker came on, Pandev missed an open goal in the 85th minute, hitting the crossbar from six yards out after a square pass across the face of goal was played to him; Napoli managed to win the match 3–1.

On 29 November, Pandev came in for an injured Edinson Cavani and started a home game against rivals Juventus. He scored two goals, the first of which was his first for Napoli, and the second a volleyed goal. The two goals put Napoli up 3–1 but Juventus came back to tie the game at 3–3, the final score. Pandev then went on to score his third Serie A goal for Napoli in their 6–1 pummeling of Genoa on 21 December.

Following the winter break, Pandev netted his side's opening goal in a 1–3 win in Sicily over Palermo on 8 January 2012.

On 20 May 2012, Pandev won another Coppa Italia, setting up Marek Hamšík's goal in a 2–0 win over Juventus in Rome, meaning that he had been on the tournament's winning side for the past four consecutive years.

On 6 June 2012, Pandev made a permanent switch from Inter to Napoli. Later, Napoli President Aurelio De Laurentiis noted on a radio interview that Pandev had taken a pay cut to join the Neapolitans, with the President noting this as a sign of commitment to the club and fans.

On 28 September 2013, Pandev scored both goals in Napoli's win over Genoa, sending the Neapolitans to the top of the league table.

Pandev came on in place of Gonzalo Higuaín for the last 20 minutes of the 2014 Coppa Italia Final, which Napoli won 3–1 against Fiorentina.

Galatasaray
On 1 September 2014, Pandev signed a 1+1-year contract with Turkish club Galatasaray worth €2.4 million a year. Pandev struggled for game time at Galatasaray and he was mainly used as a cup player.

Genoa
Pandev signed a two-year contract with Italian club Genoa in 2015 after failing to get playing time at Galatasaray. He planned on retiring at the end of the 2019–20 season, but extended his contract following the postponement of Euro 2020 to 2021.

With a brace against Benevento on 21 April 2021, Pandev reached the 100-goal mark in his Serie A career. He became the first Macedonian to reach the century mark in one of the "Big 5" European leagues. He ended the 2020–21 season with his highest goals plus assists per 90 minutes since 2013–14.

On 13 August 2021, Pandev signed a contract with Genoa to stay in Serie A until 30 June 2022.

Parma
On 31 January 2022, Pandev moved to Parma in Serie B on a permanent deal, retiring after the completion of the 2021/22 season.

International career
Pandev made his senior debut for Macedonia in a June 2001 FIFA World Cup qualification match away against Turkey. With two goals against Spain on 12 August 2009, he became the national team's all-time leading scorer, surpassing Gjorgji Hristov.

He intended to retire from international football in 2015, but was persuaded to keep playing by national manager Igor Angelovski. Pandev earned his 100th cap in a 3–1 home win over Latvia in UEFA Euro 2020 qualification in March 2019.  He scored the team's only goal in North Macedonia's 1–0 Euro 2020 play-off victory over Georgia in November 2020, which saw his nation qualify for a major international tournament for the very first time. In the tournament he scored North Macedonia's first ever goal at a major tournament, pouncing on a mistake to score in an open net in a 3–1 defeat to Austria at Euro 2020 in the nation's competition debut, making him the second-oldest scorer in the finals of a European Championship, only behind Ivica Vastić. On 21 June 2021, he played his last match for his national team against the Netherlands in the last group stage match of the Euro 2020.

Style of play 
Considered to be the greatest Macedonian forward of all time, Pandev was a quick, creative, and hard-working left-footed forward with good technique, who was capable both of creating and scoring goals, due to his opportunism and shooting accuracy, as well as his vision and passing ability. He was capable of playing in several offensive positions, either on the right or through the centre of the pitch, and was usually deployed in a supporting role, as a winger, as a second striker, or as an attacking midfielder, although he had also been fielded as a striker or as a false nine.

Personal life
Goran Pandev is married to Nada Pandeva and they have three children, Filippo, Ana and Sofia. His younger brother Sashko is also a football player. In 2019, Pandev obtained Italian citizenship in Naples. A year later, he auctioned the shirt he wore in the match in which he gained his 100th cap for Macedonia for a hospital fighting the coronavirus pandemic.

In 2010, he founded a football academy in his native Macedonia, named Akademija Pandev. Their senior team now plays in the Macedonian First League, and is a one-time cup winner from back to 2019.

Career statistics

Club

International

Scores and results list North Macedonia's goal tally first, score column indicates score after each Pandev goal

Honours
Lazio
 Coppa Italia: 2008–09

Inter Milan 
 Serie A: 2009–10
 Coppa Italia: 2009–10, 2010–11
 Supercoppa Italiana: 2010
 UEFA Champions League: 2009–10
 FIFA Club World Cup: 2010

Napoli
Coppa Italia: 2011–12, 2013–14

Galatasaray 
 Süper Lig: 2014–15
 Turkish Cup: 2014–15

Individual
 Macedonian Footballer of the Year: 2004, 2006, 2007, 2008, 2010
 Coppa Italia top scorer: 2008–09, 2016–17

See also

List of men's footballers with 100 or more international caps

References

External links

 
 Goran Pandev Fans Community
 GoranPandev.com

1983 births
Living people
Sportspeople from Strumica
People with acquired Italian citizenship
Association football forwards
Macedonian footballers
North Macedonia youth international footballers
North Macedonia under-21 international footballers
North Macedonia international footballers
FIFA Century Club
FK Belasica players
Inter Milan players
Spezia Calcio players
A.C. Ancona players
S.S. Lazio players
S.S.C. Napoli players
Galatasaray S.K. footballers
Genoa C.F.C. players
Parma Calcio 1913 players
Macedonian First Football League players
Serie A players
Serie B players
Serie C players
Süper Lig players
UEFA Euro 2020 players
Macedonian expatriate footballers
Macedonian expatriate sportspeople in Italy
Expatriate footballers in Italy
Expatriate footballers in Turkey
Macedonian expatriate sportspeople in Turkey
UEFA Champions League winning players
Naturalised citizens of Italy